Daryl Ferguson (born 4 June 1985) is a Barbadian footballer who plays for Evergreen Diplomats in the American Soccer League.

Early life
Born in Maryland to a Barbadian mother and Grenadian father, Ferguson spent time with D.C. United's Super Y-League before going on to play college soccer at Seton Hill University. During his college years Ferguson also played two seasons for the Delaware Dynasty in the USL Premier Development League, and trained with the Charleston Battery of the USL First Division.

Club career
Ferguson turned professional in December 2007 when he signed for the Real Maryland Monarchs of the USL Second Division. He played 18 games for the Monarchs in his debut professional season, but was released at the end of the season.

After a couple of years away from the professional game, Ferguson returned to play with Fredericksburg Hotspur in the USL Premier Development League in 2011.

International career
Ferguson is a full international for the Barbados national football team, having previously played for the country at U-23 level, and in qualifying for the Olympic Games. In his only senior appearance to date, a World Cup qualifier against the United States in 2008, Ferguson was the only Barbados player to put the ball in the net - unfortunately, it was his own. The USA won, 8-0.

References

External links
 
 Daryl Ferguson at the Caribbean Football Database
 Delaware Dynasty 2006 stats at USL Soccer
 
 Daryl Ferguson at Infosport

1985 births
Living people
People from Lanham, Maryland
Soccer players from Maryland
Seton Hill University alumni
People with acquired Barbadian citizenship
Barbadian footballers
Barbados international footballers
Delaware Dynasty players
Real Maryland F.C. players
Fredericksburg Hotspur players
Evergreen Diplomats players
USL League Two players
USL Second Division players
American people of Barbadian descent
Sportspeople of Barbadian descent
American people of Grenadian descent
Sportspeople of Grenadian descent
Association football defenders